Colonel Sir Lionel Arthur Montagu Stopford  (10 May 1860 – 13 September 1942) was a British Army officer who became Commandant of the Royal Military College Sandhurst.

Military career
Son of Vice-Admiral The Hon. Sir Montagu Stopford, Lionel Stopford was commissioned into the Clare Militia and then transferred to the Irish Guards. He fought in the 1882 Anglo-Egyptian War and took part in the Sikkim Expedition in 1888. He was appointed Deputy Assistant Adjutant-General in Ireland in 1898, Deputy Assistant Quartermaster-General at Army Headquarters in 1904 and Deputy Assistant Adjutant-General at the Staff College, Camberley in 1905. He went on to be Assistant Adjutant-General at the War Office in 1909 and Commandant of the Royal Military College Sandhurst in 1911 before serving in World War I as a Brigade Commander until 1916 when he returned to his post as Commandant at Sandhurst.

In retirement he was Deputy Lieutenant of Kent.

Family
In 1891 he married Mabel Georgina Emily Mackenzie; they had two sons (one of which was General Sir Montagu Stopford).

References

 

|-
 

1860 births
1942 deaths
Military personnel from Torquay
Academics of the Staff College, Camberley
Knights Commander of the Royal Victorian Order
Companions of the Order of the Bath
Deputy Lieutenants of Kent
Irish Guards officers
British Army personnel of the Anglo-Egyptian War
British Army personnel of World War I
Lionel
Commandants of Sandhurst
Burials in Surrey